Kiokio is a Māori word that may refer to:

Plants
Lomaria discolor, syn. Blechnum discolor, New Zealand fern species
Parablechnum novae-zelandiae, syn. Blechnum novae-zelandiae, New Zealand fern species resembling a palm leaf
Parablechnum procerum, syn. Blechnum procerum, New Zealand mountain fern species

Schools
Kio Kio, a rural community in Waikato Region, New Zealand
Kio Kio School, a rural school in Waikato Region, New Zealand
Kiokio railway station, former railway station